The Wild is the fourth studio album by Canadian band The Rural Alberta Advantage. It was released on October 13, 2017 through Paper Bag Records.

Track listing

Charts

References

2017 albums
The Rural Alberta Advantage albums
Paper Bag Records albums